Matthew Nicholls may refer to:

 Mathew Nicholls, Australian rules football field umpire
 Matthew Nicholls (classicist) (born 1978), professor of classics

See also
 Matt Nichols (born 1987), American player of Canadian football